Marc White is an English football founder, owner, chairman, and manager of Dorking Wanderers.

Career

White founded Dorking Wanderers in 1999. He helped Dorking Wanderers achieve 12 promotions within 23 seasons from the English seventeenth tier to the English fifth tier.

References

English football chairmen and investors
English football managers
English footballers
Living people
National League (English football) managers
Year of birth missing (living people)